PUA or Pua

Science and technology
 Potentially unwanted program, a type of privacy-invasive software
 Private Use Areas, in Unicode
 Pua novaezealandiae, a spider in the family Anapidae
 Pua Aloalo, Hawaiian hibiscus, the state flower of Hawaii
 Pua keni keni, Fagraea berteroana, or perfume flower tree, a small spreading tree which grows in the sub-tropics

Other
Anti-Communist Unification Party, defunct political party in Guatemala
 Pandemic Unemployment Assistance, a type of unemployment insurance in the United States tailored specifically toward those who became unemployed due to the COVID-19 pandemic
Pharos University in Alexandria, Egypt
Pickup artist, a man who trains in the skills and art of finding, attracting, building comfort with, and seducing women
Primary urban area, definition used for comparing English cities.
Proto-Uto-Aztecan language, hypothesised reconstructed proto-language for the Uto-Aztecan language family
Pua, Moana's pig in Moana
Pua District, a district in Thailand
PUA Publicaciones Universitarias Argentinas, an imprint of VDM Publishing